Wellston is a St. Louis MetroLink station. It is primarily a commuter station featuring 243 park and ride spaces. The station gets its name from the inner-ring suburb of Wellston where the station is located.

In 2013, Metro's Arts in Transit program commissioned the work Everyone Appreciates a Punctual Train by Mary Lucking for installation at this station. The bronze figurines represent animals that live around the station – birds, squirrels, rabbits – that are unconcerned with schedules and live by the natural rhythms set by the sun and the seasons. This artwork depicts a fantastical reality in which these animals share the wait with us and commiserate with our desire to move time forward despite the unmoving clock hands.

Station layout
Wellston is the only station on the MetroLink system with staggered platforms. The westbound platform is located north of Plymouth Avenue while the eastbound platform is located to the south. Each platform can be accessed via a ramp from Plymouth Avenue.

References

External links 
 St. Louis Metro

MetroLink stations in St. Louis County, Missouri
Red Line (St. Louis MetroLink)
Railway stations in the United States opened in 1993